John Lafayette Girardeau (14 November 1825  23 June 1898) was a Reformed theologian and minister in the Presbyterian Church in the United States. He is notable as a Calvinist defender of libertarianism, the teaching that people have free will to choose between alternatives, and that they could have chosen differently than they actually did, rather than a determinist or compatibilist view.

He was a professor of systematic theology at Columbia Theological Seminary in South Carolina.

Bibliography
Music in the Church (1888)

Calvinism and Evangelical Arminianism (1890)

The Will in its Theological Relations (1891)

Discussions of Philosophical Questions (1900)

Discussions of Theological Questions (1905)

Sermons on Important Subjects: Edited by George Blackstone (1907)

References

1825 births
1898 deaths
Presbyterian Church in the United States ministers
19th-century Calvinist and Reformed theologians
American Calvinist and Reformed theologians
Presbyterian Church in the United States members
19th-century American clergy